The 2019 FC Edmonton season was the eighth season in the club's history, as well as the first season in Canadian Premier League history.

Overview 
After finishing in seventh place in the 2017 NASL season, FC Edmonton discontinued professional operations, but kept their academy. Co-owner Tom Fath stated that the franchise had proved to be unsustainable in the Edmonton market, and the decision was reinforced by the uncertainty surrounding the status of the NASL. Despite these events, there was speculation that the still under construction Canadian Premier League was looking at Edmonton as a potential market. That speculation proved to be correct on June 8, 2018, when it was announced that Edmonton had come out of hiatus and officially joined the new league. A new logo was revealed, and it was announced that the team would continue to play at Clarke Stadium.

On July 3, 2018, Jeff Paulus was named head coach. He had formerly been an assistant coach for the first team and technical director of the academy. On November 28, FC Edmonton announced their first two signings as members of the CPL, academy graduate Allan Zebie, who played for the team in 2017, and former Vancouver Whitecap Randy Edwini-Bonsu, who played minor soccer in Edmonton as a child. The Eddies signed more academy graduates, including Bruno Zebie, Ajeej Sarkaria and Ajay Khabra. On December 13, South Korean midfielder Son Yong-chan was signed, Edmonton's first international signing as a Canadian Premier League club.

Squad
As of October 19, 2019.

Transfers

In

Transferred in

Draft picks 
FC Edmonton selected the following players in the 2018 CPL–U Sports Draft on November 12, 2018. Draft picks are not automatically signed to the team roster. Only those who are signed to a contract will be listed as transfers in.

Out

Competitions 
Match times are Mountain Daylight Time (UTC−6).

Preseason

Canadian Premier League

Spring season

League table

2019 CONCACAF League qualification table

Results summary

Results by match

Matches

Fall season

League table

Results summary

Results by match

Matches

Canadian Championship

Statistics

Squad and statistics 

|-

 
 
 

 

  

 

 

 
|}

Top scorers 
{| class="wikitable sortable alternance"  style="font-size:85%; text-align:center; line-height:14px; width:85%;"
|-
!width=10|Rank
!width=10|Nat.
! scope="col" style="width:275px;"|Player
!width=10|Pos.
!width=80|CPL Spring season
!width=80|CPL Fall season
!width=80|Canadian Championship
!width=80|TOTAL
|-
|1|||| Easton Ongaro        || FW || 0 || 10 ||0 ||10
|-
|2|||| Oumar Diouck        || FW || 4 || 2 || 1 ||7
|-
|3|||| Tomi Ameobi        || FW || 1 || 3 || 0 ||4
|-
|4|||| Mélé Temguia        || DF || 1 || 1 || 1 ||3
|-
|rowspan=4|5|||| Prince Amanda        || MF || 0 || 1 || 0 ||1
|-
||| Ramón Soria        || DF || 0 || 1 ||0 ||1
|-
||| Marcus Velado-Tsegaye        || MF || 1 || 0 ||0 ||1
|-
||| Bruno Zebie        || MF || 1 || 0 || 0 ||1
|-
|colspan="4"|Own goals      || 0 || 1 || 0 ||1
|-
|- class="sortbottom"
| colspan="4"|Totals||8||19||2||29

Top assists 
{| class="wikitable sortable alternance"  style="font-size:85%; text-align:center; line-height:14px; width:85%;"
|-
!width=10|Rank
!width=10|Nat.
! scope="col" style="width:275px;"|Player
!width=10|Pos.
!width=80|CPL Spring season
!width=80|CPL Fall season
!width=80|Canadian Championship
!width=80|TOTAL
|-
|rowspan=2|1|||| Amer Didic        || DF || 1 || 2 || 0 ||3
|-
||| Ramón Soria        || DF || 2 || 1 || 0 ||3
|-
|rowspan=4|3|||| Oumar Diouck        || FW || 0 || 2 || 0 ||2
|-
||| Jeannot Esua        || DF || 1 || 1 || 0 ||2
|-
||| Edem Mortotsi        || MF || 0 || 2 || 0 ||2
|-
||| Easton Ongaro        || FW || 1 || 1 || 0 ||2
|-
|rowspan=6|7|||| Prince Amanda        || MF || 0 || 1 || 0 ||1
|-
||| Tomi Ameobi        || FW || 0 || 0 || 1 ||1
|-
||| Randy Edwini-Bonsu        || FW || 0 || 1 || 0 ||1
|-
||| Philippe Lincourt-Joseph        || MF || 0 || 1 || 0 ||1
|-
||| Ajeej Sarkaria        || FW || 0 || 1 || 0 ||1
|-
||| Son Yong-chan        || MF || 1 || 0 || 0 ||1
|-
|- class="sortbottom"
| colspan="4"|Totals||6||13||1||20

Clean sheets 
{| class="wikitable sortable alternance"  style="font-size:85%; text-align:center; line-height:14px; width:85%;"
|-
!width=10|Rank
!width=10|Nat.
! scope="col" style="width:275px;"|Player
!width=80|CPL Spring season
!width=80|CPL Fall season
!width=80|Canadian Championship
!width=80|TOTAL
|-
|1|||| Connor James        || 4 || 3 || 0 ||7
|-
|2|||| Dylon Powley        || 0 || 1 || 0 ||1
|-
|- class="sortbottom"
| colspan="3"|Totals||4||4||0||8

Disciplinary record 
{| class="wikitable sortable alternance"  style="font-size:85%; text-align:center; line-height:14px; width:85%;"
|-
!rowspan="2" width=10|No.
!rowspan="2" width=10|Pos.
!rowspan="2" width=10|Nat.
!rowspan="2" scope="col" style="width:275px;"|Player
!colspan="2" width=80|CPL Spring season
!colspan="2" width=80|CPL Fall season
!colspan="2" width=80|Canadian Championship
!colspan="2" width=80|TOTAL
|-
! !!  !!  !!  !!  !!  !!  !! 
|-
|3||DF|||| Jeannot Esua    ||2||0||0||1||1||0||3||1
|-
|4||DF|||| Allan Zebie    ||0||0||1||0||0||0||1||0
|-
|5||DF|||| Ramón Soria    ||1||0||2||0||0||0||3||0
|-
|6||MF|||| Edem Mortotsi    ||0||0||1||0||0||0||1||0
|-
|7||MF|||| Son Yong-chan    ||1||0||0||0||0||0||1||0
|-
|8||DF|||| Mélé Temguia    ||1||0||2||0||0||0||3||0
|-
|9||FW|||| Ajeej Sarkaria    ||0||0||1||0||0||0||1||0
|-
|10||MF|||| Philippe Lincourt-Joseph    ||0||1||0||0||0||0||0||1
|-
|11||FW|||| Randy Edwini-Bonsu    ||0||0||1||0||2||0||3||0
|-
|12||DF|||| Kareem Moses    ||2||0||0||0||0||0||2||0
|-
|14||MF|||| James Marcelin    ||0||0||2||0||2||0||4||0
|-
|17||MF|||| Marcus Velado-Tsegaye    ||0||0||1||0||0||0||1||0
|-
|18||FW|||| Tomi Ameobi    ||1||0||3||0||0||0||4||0
|-
|19||FW|||| Easton Ongaro    ||0||0||1||0||0||0||1||0
|-
|20||MF|||| Bruno Zebie    ||1||0||1||0||0||0||2||0
|-
|45||FW|||| Oumar Diouck    ||1||0||5||0||0||0||6||0
|-
|55||DF|||| Amer Didic    ||1||0||2||0||0||0||3||0
|-
|- class="sortbottom"
| colspan="4"|Totals||11||1||22||1||5||0||38||2

References

External links 
2019 FC Edmonton season at Official Site

FC Edmonton seasons
FC Edmonton
EDM
FC Edmonton